Masque is a fictional supervillain appearing in American comic books published by Marvel Comics. Masque was originally a prominent member of the sewer-dwelling community of mutant outcasts called the Morlocks, led by Callisto.

Publication history
Masque first appeared in The Uncanny X-Men #169-170 (May–June 1983), and was created by Chris Claremont and Paul Smith.

Masque appeared as part of the "Morlocks" entry in The Official Handbook of the Marvel Universe Deluxe Edition #9, and the All-New Official Handbook of the Marvel Universe A-Z #7 (2006).

Fictional character biography
Little is known about Masque's life, except that he was born with severe facial deformities, which led to him living the life as an outcast. This was furthered when Masque discovered that he was a mutant born with the ability to alter people's faces and bodies, reshaping them to whatever he wants. Masque's own body is immune to his powers. This cruel irony embittered Masque against the world and those whose beauty Masque envied and loathed. At some point, Masque was recruited by fellow mutant Callisto, who was seeking to create a new community for homeless and deformed mutants such as Masque and her allies (Caliban, Sunder, and Plague). Masque's job was to use his powers to make ordinary-looking recruits to the Morlock community look ugly in order to conform to Callisto's notions of the Morlocks being an all-outcast community. The sadistic joy Masque took in using his powers and the fact that he often would turn his victims into outright deformed monsters, created tension between him and Callisto, who would often be forced to make Masque undo his work and restore his victims to normal.

Masque first appeared in the Morlock tunnels after Callisto kidnapped the X-Man Angel to be her unwilling groom. Masque later joins in on Callisto's kidnapping of Shadowcat (Kitty Pryde), to force her to go through with her promise to marry Caliban in exchange for his assistance in getting the Morlock, Healer, to help Colossus, after being left melted by Pyro and flash-frozen by Avalanche using liquid nitrogen. As part of their plot, Masque uses his power to turn the corpse of a teenager into a perfect copy of Kitty. However, the body is exposed as a fraud by Wolverine's enhanced sense of smell (a factor Masque and Callisto had not taken into account due to Wolverine being absent when the X-Men first met the Morlocks). Masque uses his powers without Callisto's permission, to rapidly age the faces of the members of Power Pack as part of a plot to kidnap them for a fellow Morlock, whose own children had recently been killed.

Masque joins a quartet of mutants known as "The Tunnellers", who ultimately are taken in by X-Factor in the aftermath of the Marauders slaughtering the Morlock community.  They leave X-Factor's headquarters, but cause chaos in the city of New York as Masque mutilates the faces of several gang members who kill one of the Tunnellers. When a police officer shoots Masque, the villain is forced to return to the heroes for medical treatment.

With Callisto presumed dead, Masque begins work on consolidating power among the Morlocks living under X-Factor's roof. He also targets Skids (a Morlock whose force field power protected her from Masque's power) and her lover Rusty Collins. Rusty submits to Masque's savage touch in exchange for Masque using his powers to restore the face of a prostitute that Rusty accidentally disfigured, when his fire-based power first manifested. However, the prostitute orders Masque to undo what he has done to her and Rusty, having found religion and horrified that Rusty would sacrifice his own face to restore hers. Masque consented to her request, but took comfort that he had won the greater game. Despite Caliban's desperate pleas, the Morlocks that X-Factor had taken in were ready to return to the tunnels and had elected Masque their new leader.

Now in control of the Morlocks, Masque uses his powers to irreversibly disfigure just about all of the Morlocks, warping them into inhuman shapes and form, as well as fundamentally warping countless Morlocks into the bodies of strangers. One of these is Bliss, who goes from being turned into a duplicate of Jean Grey to being turned into a duplicate of Storm. Masque soon learns that Callisto is alive and well when Callisto turns up at the recently destroyed X-Men mansion, having been given the task of locking up the underground portion. Capturing Callisto, he demands she give up the codes for the underground portion of the mansion. When she refuses, Masque transforms the one-eyed tomboy Callisto into a beauty queen-type pin-up model and forces her to become a professional model in order to earn money for the Morlock community. Callisto appears on several billboards in New York City, attracting the attention of the amnesiac Colossus (after having traveled through the Siege Perilous). He falls in love with her, though Callisto is hesitant to reveal to him his true identity, as she seeks to shield him from Masque.

Keeping an eye on the X-Men mansion, Masque has Bliss kidnap Jean Grey and later Banshee, using his powers on both to disfigure them: Jean Grey gets tentacle arms while Banshee's mouth has been erased from his face. He also kidnaps Callisto and Colossus, whose body is warped to become a replica of his armored form. The mutant Forge rescues the four and while Callisto is able to force Masque to restore Colossus's humanity, the villain refuses to restore Jean Grey or Banshee. Luckily, Forge creates a device that resets Jean and Banshee's bodies to their original forms after they leave the Morlock tunnel. Masque would fight Jean Grey again, when X-Factor and Ghost Rider Danny Ketch came to the aid of a young Morlock named Angel, who alerted them of Masque's desire to warp the bodies of the children of the Morlock community. He also encountered Caliban again, now a giant muscular mutant thanks to a deal he made with Apocalypse and fought Cable and the New Mutants.

By this point, Masque is now training the Morlocks to become his own personal army and starts talking about staging raids against the people on the surface. The war talk frightens the Morlock known as Feral, who flees the tunnels and seeks sanctuary with the New Mutants. Cable accepts her onto his team and when Masque comes calling to collect her, Cable kills Masque's bodyguard and given the warning that if he attacks Cable and his friends again, Cable will kill Masque.

Feeling humiliated by Cable, Masque and Feral's sister Thorn enter into an alliance with Toad's Brotherhood of Evil Mutants and launch an attack against Cable and the New Mutants (now called X-Force). The battle does not go well for Masque, as Shatterstar kills him with one of his swords. Prior to his death, Cable vows to decapitate Masque and carry his head on a pike into the Morlock tunnels as a warning to his people. Instead, Cable opts to take Masque's bloody robe and mark into the tunnels with it as a proclamation that Masque was dead.

Masque would be presumed dead for quite some time, until the events of XTreme X-Men #36–39. It is not said how Masque survived or faked his death, but both Storm and Callisto (whom Masque has enslaved by use of his powers and physical abuse) are not shocked to see him alive, nor are they shocked that he now possessed a new non-disfigured female form. Masque had gotten involved in the underground mutant gladiator circuit and had once again ensnarled Callisto, this time both enslaving her and giving her tentacle arms ala Jean Grey. After Callisto beat Storm, Storm became Masque's slave though Storm and Callisto began plotting their rebellion against Masque. Ultimately, the two defeated the villain and Masque was last seen having his new female face mutilated by Callisto in retaliation for what was done to her by Masque.

Masque reappears, leading a band of Morlocks (including Erg, Litterbug, Skids, and Bliss) in search of Magneto, hoping to inform him of a prophecy that says mutants may yet come to rule the world. However, their interpretation of the prophecy is contradicted by the now powerless prophetess who wrote the book they seek to give Magneto. As Caliban is protecting the woman's location, Masque orders Caliban attack and the mutant Leech kidnapped so that his powers can be used against those who would oppose him. Masque uses his powers to undo the genetic modification done to Caliban's physique by Apocalypse.

Masque orders his group to set off a bomb in a packed subway train, allowing Masque to come on board and use his powers to disfigure the humans on the train. Masque also makes a video of why they did it in hopes Magneto will see it and seek Masque out. During the following fight, Masque's ability to warp his body is revealed, as he briefly tricks the X-Men into thinking he is Leech before ultimately being defeated. Finally, Professor X is made to use his psychic power on Masque to force him to restore the faces of those who he disfigured.

Masque later appears as a member of the Utopians alongside Elixir, Karma, Madison Jeffries, Random, and Tabitha Smith.

Powers and abilities

Masque possesses the ability to change the physical appearance of any other person by touch, manipulating it like clay through physical contact. When the Morlocks formed, Masque's job was to use his powers on those Morlocks who were not "ugly enough" to be considered a true outcast by Callisto. Originally, it was stated that Masque (who was born disfigured as far as missing an eye and having facial disfigurement where his eye should be) could not use his powers on himself.

During the "Storm: The Arena" storyline, Masque was shown however with a new female body. The explanation for this would not be given on page during the storyline, but would be addressed during the Extremists storyline. When the X-Men rescued Caliban, whose genetic alterations were undone by Masque, Xavier mentions the fact that Masque had undergone a "secondary mutation"; which is why he can now alter his own physical form, as well as undo the genetic manipulation done to Caliban by Apocalypse, effectively stripping Caliban of the super-human strength and invulnerability given to him by Apocalypse. Masque's ability to warp his own face was ultimately shown later in the storyline, when he warps himself into the form of Leech, in order to get the drop on the members of the X-Men.

Other versions
Masque appears in What If? vol. 2 #46 (Feb. 1993) – 'What If... Cable Had Destroyed The X-Men?', where the members of Freedom Force are shown forcing the Morlocks to retreat back underground.

A different version in the X-Men Forever series assists the X-Men in defusing a potential war between Genosha and Wakanda.

References

External links
 Masque at Marvel.com
 Masque at Marvel Wiki
 Masque at Comic Vine

Comics characters introduced in 1983
Characters created by Chris Claremont
Fictional androgynes
Marvel Comics mutants
Marvel Comics supervillains